Thomas Bellingham (1646 – 15 September 1721) was an Anglo-Irish soldier and politician.

Bellingham was the son of Henry Bellingham and Lucy Sibthorpe. He was educated at the cathedral school of St Patrick's Cathedral, Dublin before entering Trinity College Dublin on 16 February 1660.

He was appointed High Sheriff of Louth in 1684. Following the Glorious Revolution in 1688, Bellingham fled Ireland to live with cousins in Preston, Lancashire. His house at Castlebellingham was burnt down by Jacobites in 1690. He returned to Ireland in May 1690 as a colonel in the army of William III of England. He was an aide to King William prior to the Battle of the Boyne, when his knowledge of the Louth countryside aided Williamite preparations for the battle. He was appointed High Sheriff of Louth for a second term in 1690.

Following the conclusion of the Williamite War in Ireland, Bellingham was elected as a Member of Parliament for Louth in the Irish House of Commons, sitting between 1692 and 1713. 

He rebuilt the family home of Bellingham Castle in the Dutch style in the 1690s. He kept a campaign diary for the period 28 August 1689 to 12 September 1690, which was edited and published by Anthony Hewitson as the Diary of Thomas Bellingham, an officer under William III (1908).

References

1646 births
1721 deaths
17th-century Anglo-Irish people
18th-century Anglo-Irish people
Alumni of Trinity College Dublin
High Sheriffs of County Louth
Irish MPs 1692–1693
Irish MPs 1695–1699
Irish MPs 1703–1713
Members of the Parliament of Ireland (pre-1801) for County Louth constituencies
Williamite military personnel of the Williamite War in Ireland